In Belgium, there are judicial and electoral cantons.

Judicial cantons
A judicial canton is a group of municipalities over which a single justice of the peace has jurisdiction. A judicial arrondissement consists of all judicial cantons on its territory. There are 187 judicial cantons in Belgium as of 2017. Most judicial cantons cover multiple municipalities; however larger towns and cities are often divided into more than one judicial canton. The city of Antwerp, for instance, is divided into 12 judicial cantons. A judicial canton has an average population of 60,000 people, but some have a population as low as 30,000 people or as high as 100,000 people.

Electoral cantons
An electoral canton is a group of municipalities in which elections are organised by one Canton Principal Office. It does not necessarily correspond with a judicial canton. Each electoral canton consists of one or more whole municipalities, and each canton is wholly within a single administrative arrondissement.

There are 209 electoral cantons in Belgium, of which 8 are in Brussels, 104 are in Flanders, and 97 are in Wallonia. The newest canton is Sint-Genesius-Rode in Flemish Brabant, which was created in 2014. The cantons were the lowest, most detailed level at which election results were available, until the 2014 elections when the FPS Interior also published results at municipality level.

Brussels
Anderlecht
Brussels
Ixelles/Elsene
Molenbeek-Saint-Jean/Sint-Jans-Molenbeek
Saint-Gilles/Sint-Gillis
Saint-Josse-ten-Noode/Sint-Joost-ten-Node
Schaerbeek/Schaarbeek
Uccle/Ukkel

Flanders

Antwerp
Antwerp
Arendonk
Boom
Brecht
Duffel
Heist-op-den-Berg
Herentals
Hoogstraten
Kapellen
Kontich
Lier
Mechelen
Mol
Puurs
Turnhout
Westerlo
Zandhoven

East Flanders
Aalst
Assenede
Beveren-Waas
Brakel
Deinze
Dendermonde
Destelbergen
Eeklo
Evergem
Ghent
Geraardsbergen
Hamme
Herzele
Horebeke
Kaprijke
Kruishoutem
Lochristi
Lokeren
Merelbeke
Nazareth
Nevele
Ninove
Oudenaarde
Ronse
Sint-Gillis-Waas
Sint-Niklaas
Temse
Waarschoot
Wetteren
Zele
Zomergem
Zottegem

Flemish Brabant
Aarschot
Asse
Diest
Glabbeek
Haacht
Halle
Landen
Lennik
Leuven
Meise
Sint-Genesius-Rode
Tienen
Vilvoorde
Zaventem
Zoutleeuw

Limburg
Beringen
Bilzen
Borgloon
Bree
Genk
Hasselt
Herk-de-Stad
Maaseik
Maasmechelen
Neerpelt
Peer
Riemst
Sint-Truiden
Tongeren
Voeren

West Flanders
Avelgem
Bruges
Diksmuide
Gistel
Harelbeke
Hooglede
Ypres
Izegem
Kortrijk
Lichtervelde
Menen
Mesen
Meulebeke
Nieuwpoort
Ostend
Oostrozebeke
Poperinge
Roeselare
Ruiselede
Tielt
Torhout
Veurne
Vleteren
Wervik
Zonnebeke

Wallonia

Hainaut
Antoing
Ath
Beaumont
Belœil
Binche
Boussu
Celles
Charleroi
Chimay
Chièvres
Châtelet
Comines-Warneton
Dour
Enghien
Estaimpuis
Flobecq
Fontaine-l'Évêque
Frameries
Frasnes-lez-Anvaing
La Louvière
Le Rœulx
Lens
Lessines
Leuze-en-Hainaut
Merbes-le-Château
Mons
Mouscron
Péruwelz
Seneffe
Soignies
Thuin
Tournai

Liège
Aubel
Aywaille
Bassenge
Dison
Eupen
Ferrières
Fléron
Grâce-Hollogne
Hannut
Herstal
Herve
Huy
Héron
Limbourg
Liège
Malmedy
Nandrin
Saint-Nicolas
St. Vith
Seraing
Spa
Stavelot
Verlaine
Verviers
Visé
Waremme

Luxembourg
Arlon
Bastogne
Bouillon
Durbuy
Érezée
Fauvillers
Florenville
Houffalize
La Roche-en-Ardenne
Marche-en-Famenne
Messancy
Nassogne
Neufchâteau
Paliseul
Saint-Hubert
Sainte-Ode
Vielsalm
Virton
Wellin
Étalle

Namur
Andenne
Beauraing
Ciney
Couvin
Dinant
Éghezée
Florennes
Fosses-la-Ville
Gedinne
Gembloux
Namur
Philippeville
Rochefort
Walcourt

Walloon Brabant
Genappe
Jodoigne
Nivelles
Perwez
Wavre

 
Subdivisions of Belgium